Adolf Selmani (born 26 June 2000) is an Albanian professional footballer who currently play as a centre-back for Albanian club Kastrioti.

He is the younger brother of Gentian Selmani of Turkish club Boluspor and the Albania national team, as well as the older brother of Santiago Selmani who also plays for Kastrioti.

References

2000 births
Living people
People from Krujë
People from Durrës County
Albanian footballers
Association football defenders
FK Partizani Tirana players
KS Iliria players
KS Kastrioti players
Kategoria Superiore players
Kategoria e Parë players
KF Laçi players
KF Teuta Durrës players